Myrsine tahuatensis is a species of plant in the family Primulaceae. It is endemic to French Polynesia.

References

Endemic flora of French Polynesia
tahuatensis
Data deficient plants
Taxonomy articles created by Polbot